Youssoufia may refer to:
 Youssoufia, Algeria
 Youssoufia, Morocco